Ross Rowe, known professionally as Senim Silla ("all is mines" spelled backwards), is a hip hop artist from Pontiac, Michigan, best known as one of the two MCs in rap duo Binary Star, along with One Be Lo.

Senim Silla co-hosts the Foreally Show with lifelong friend and Shade 45 DJ Rude Jude.

As of March 2014, Senim Silla is retired from music.

Discography

Binary Star
Waterworld (1999)
Masters of the Universe (2000)
Binary Star EP (2013)

Solo
The Name, The Motto, The Outcome (2007)

References

Living people
American hip hop musicians
People from Aurora, Colorado
Musicians from Pontiac, Michigan
Musicians from Colorado
Year of birth missing (living people)